The posts of shadow United States senator and shadow United States representative are held by elected or appointed government officials from subnational polities of the United States that lack congressional vote. While these officials are not seated in either chamber of Congress, they seek recognition for their subnational polity, up to full statehood. This would enfranchise them with full voting rights on the floor of the US House and Senate, alongside existing states. , only the District of Columbia and Puerto Rico currently have authorized shadow delegations to Congress.

History
Historically, shadow members of Congress were elected by organized incorporated territories prior to their admission to the Union. From its origins in Tennessee, this approach is sometimes known as the Tennessee Plan.

The first shadow senators, William Blount and William Cocke of the Southwest Territory, were elected in March 1796 before being seated as senators representing the newly formed state of Tennessee. Michigan, California, Minnesota, Oregon, and Alaska likewise elected shadow senators before statehood. The Alaska Territory also elected the first shadow U.S. representative, Ralph Julian Rivers, in 1956. All were eventually seated in Congress as voting members, except for Alaska shadow senator William A. Egan, who instead became governor.

District of Columbia officeholders
The election of shadow congresspersons from the District of Columbia is authorized by a state constitution ratified by D.C. voters in 1982 but was never approved by Congress.

District of Columbia shadow senators
The voters of the District of Columbia elect two shadow U.S. senators who are known as senators by the District of Columbia but are not officially sworn in or seated by the U.S. Senate. Shadow U.S. senators were first elected in 1990.

The current shadow United States senators from the District of Columbia are Paul Strauss and Mike Brown.

|- style="height:2em"
! rowspan=8 | 1
| rowspan=8 align=left | Florence Pendleton
| rowspan=8  | Democratic
| rowspan=8 nowrap width=14% | Jan 3, 1991 –Jan 3, 2007
| rowspan=2 width=12% | Elected in 1990.
| rowspan=2 | 1
| 
| rowspan=3 | 1
| rowspan=3 width=12% | Elected in 1990.Retired.
| rowspan=3 nowrap width=14% | Jan 3, 1991 –Jan 3, 1997
| rowspan=3  | Democratic
| rowspan=3 align=right | Jesse Jackson
! rowspan=3 | 1

|- style="height:2em"
| 

|- style="height:2em"
| rowspan=3 | Re-elected in 1994.
| rowspan=3 | 2
| 

|- style="height:2em"
| 
| rowspan=3 | 2
| rowspan=3 | Elected in 1996.
| rowspan=15 nowrap wdith=14% | Jan 3, 1997 –present
| rowspan=15  | Democratic
| rowspan=15 align=right | Paul Strauss
! rowspan=15 | 2

|- style="height:2em"
| 

|- style="height:2em"
| rowspan=3 | Re-elected in 2000.Was not re-nominated as a Democrat.Lost re-election bid as an independent.
| rowspan=3 | 3
| 

|- style="height:2em"
| 
| rowspan=3 | 3
| rowspan=3 | Re-elected in 2002.

|- style="height:2em"
| 

|- style="height:2em"
! rowspan=9 | 2
| rowspan=9 align=left | Mike Brown
| rowspan=4  | Democratic
| rowspan=9 nowrap width=14% | Jan 3, 2007 –present
| rowspan=3 | Elected in 2006.
| rowspan=3 | 4
| 

|- style="height:2em"
| 
| rowspan=3 | 4
| rowspan=3 | Re-elected in 2008.

|- style="height:2em"
| 

|- style="height:2em"
| rowspan=3 | Re-elected in 2012.
| rowspan=3 | 5
| 

|- style="height:2em"
| | Independent
| 
| rowspan=3 | 5
| rowspan=3 | Re-elected in 2014.

|- style="height:2em"
| rowspan=4  | Democratic
| 

|- style="height:2em"
| rowspan=3 | Re-elected in 2018.
| rowspan=3 | 6
| 

|- style="height:2em"
| 
| rowspan=3 | 6
| rowspan=3 | Re-elected in 2020.

|- style="height:2em"
| 

|- style=height:2em"
| rowspan=1 colspan=5 | To be determined in the 2024 election.
| 7
|

District of Columbia shadow representatives
The voters of the District of Columbia elect one shadow representative who is recognized as equivalent to U.S. representatives by the District of Columbia but is not recognized by the U.S. government as an actual member of the House of Representatives. A shadow representative was first elected in 1990. Inaugural office-holder Charles Moreland held the seat for two terms. In November 2020, Oye Owolewa was elected to succeed retiring shadow representative Franklin Garcia.

D.C.'s shadow U.S. representative should not be confused with the non-voting delegate who represents the district in Congress.

Puerto Rico officeholders
The posts of shadow representatives and senators for Puerto Rico were created in 2017 as part of a newly formed Puerto Rico Equality Commission to fulfill campaign promises made by the New Progressive Party, which gained control of both the executive and legislative branch in the 2016 elections in part with calls for a status referendum in 2017. Pro-statehood governor Ricardo Rosselló appointed five shadow representatives and two shadow senators with the advice and consent of the Senate of Puerto Rico.

Following the pro-statehood vote in the 2020 Puerto Rican status referendum, the Puerto Rican legislature passed in a lame duck session Law 167 of 2020, replacing the Puerto Rico Equality Commission with the new Commission to the Congressional Delegation of Puerto Rico and establishing an electoral process for shadow delegates to Congress. Although an effort to overturn Law 167 passed the House of Representatives of Puerto Rico in early 2021 after the Popular Democratic Party gained control of the legislature, it did not have enough votes to sustain a threatened veto from pro-statehood governor Pedro Pierluisi.

Popular elections for two shadow senators and four shadow members of Congress will be held on a nonpartisan basis every four years, with the first election held on May 16, 2021, so the delegates can take office on July 1. The law also appropriated funds for the Puerto Rico Federal Affairs Administration to cover the wages of the delegates and serve as their headquarters in Washington, D.C., where they will work on the statehood process with the island's resident commissioner in Congress.

Puerto Rico shadow senators

|- style="height:2em"
! rowspan=4 | 1
| rowspan=4 align=left | Zoraida Fonalledas
| rowspan=4  | New Progressive/Republican
| rowspan=4 nowrap width=14% | Aug 15, 2017 –Jul 1, 2021
| rowspan=4 width=14% | Appointed in 2017.Successor elected.
| rowspan=4 | 1
| 
| rowspan=5 | 1
| rowspan=3 width=14% | Appointed in 2017.Died.
| rowspan=3 nowrap width=14% | Aug 15, 2017 –May 2, 2021
| rowspan=3  | New Progressive/Democratic
| rowspan=3 align=right | Carlos Romero Barceló
! rowspan=3 | 1

|- style="height:2em"
| 

|- style="height:2em"
| 

|- style="height:2em"
| rowspan=2 | —
| rowspan=2 nowrap width=14% | May 2, 2021 –Jul 1, 2021
| rowspan=2 colspan=4 | Vacant
|- style="height:2em"
! rowspan=3 | 2
| rowspan=3 align=left | Melinda Romero Donnelly
| rowspan=3  | New Progressive/Democratic
| rowspan=3 | July 1, 2021 – present
| rowspan=3 | Elected in 2021.
| rowspan=3 | 2
|- style="height:2em"
| rowspan=2 | 2
| rowspan=2 | Elected in 2021.
| rowspan=2 nowrap width=14% | Jul 1, 2021 – present
| rowspan=2  | Independent
| rowspan=2 align=right | Zoraida Buxó
! rowspan=2 | 2

|- style="height:2em"
|

Puerto Rico shadow representatives

See also
 District of Columbia voting rights
 District of Columbia statehood movement
 Federal voting rights in Puerto Rico
 Statehood movement in Puerto Rico

References

External links
A Brief History of the Shadow Senators of the United States
Washington Post article on shadow delegation
Official Site of District of Columbia
Shadow Congressional Representatives contact information
Puerto Rico Equality Commission
Puerto Rico Federal Affair Administration

Home rule and voting rights of the District of Columbia
Politics of Puerto Rico
Legislative branch of the United States government